is a private university in Kurashiki, Okayama, Japan. The predecessor of the school, junior women's college, was founded in 1951, and it became a co-ed four-year college in 2002.

External links
 Official website 

Educational institutions established in 1951
Private universities and colleges in Japan
Universities and colleges in Okayama Prefecture
1951 establishments in Japan